S. Thirunavukarasu (born 21 July 1966), better known mononymously as Tirru, is an Indian cinematographer who has worked in multiple languages across India. He won the National Film Award for Best Cinematography for 24 (2016).

Personal life
He was born in Mullukuruchi village. He became interested in photography while studying science in college. He assisted by his cousin, a dentist by profession, in the latter's passion for nature photography. He is married to an architect in Chennai and they have two children.

Career

He had initially worked as an associate to cinematographer P. C. Sreeram. Tirru's films are predominantly in the Tamil, Malayalam and Hindi languages. He co-wrote the screenplay of the Malayalam film Mission 90 Days with director Major Ravi. He is also known for television commercials, having shot more than 1000 commercials in the last 15 years. He has worked with almost all the major advertising production houses in India.

Filmography

Awards
 Kerala Film Critics Association Award for Best Cinematographer for Mullavalliyum Thenmavum (2003)
 Filmfare Award for Best Cinematographer - South for Kanchivaram (2008)
 V. Shantharam Award for Kanchivaram (2008)
 Filmfare Award for Best Cinematographer - South for 24 (2017)
 National Film Award for Best Cinematography for 24 (2017)

References

External links
 

Living people
Tamil film cinematographers
1968 births
People from Namakkal district
Malayalam film cinematographers
Best Cinematography National Film Award winners
Telugu film cinematographers
20th-century Indian photographers
21st-century Indian photographers
Cinematographers from Tamil Nadu